The Tupí or Tupinambá languages (also known as Tupi–Guarani III) are a subgroup of the Tupi–Guarani language family.

Languages
The Tupi languages are:

Old Tupi (lingua franca dialect Tupí Austral)
Tupinambá (dialects: Nheengatu  Língua Geral as lingua franca, and Potiguára)
Cocama–Omagua
Tupinikin

References

Tupi–Guarani languages